The Warner Centre is a former theater and concert hall located at 332 Fifth Avenue in Downtown Pittsburgh. It opened as the Grand Theatre on March 7, 1918, with Douglas Fairbanks in Headin' South and Winifred Westover in Her Husband’s Wife. The theater was renamed Warner Theatre on January 2, 1930. In 1983 the theater was closed, the auditorium was demolished, and a two story shopping center named Warner Center was built on the site.

It was turned into an indoor shopping mall. A food court there closed in 2003.

See also

 List of concert halls
 Theatre in Pittsburgh

References

Shopping malls in Metro Pittsburgh
Concert halls in Pennsylvania
Music venues in Pittsburgh
Theatres in Pittsburgh